A. Paul Kitchin (September 13, 1908 – October 22, 1983) was a U.S. Congressional representative from North Carolina.

Early life
Kitchin was born in Scotland Neck, North Carolina on September 13, 1908, the grandson of former congressman William H. Kitchin and the nephew of congressman Claude Kitchin and of North Carolina Governor William Walton Kitchin.  His father, Alvin Paul Kitchin, Sr., was a member of the North Carolina House of Representatives. He was educated in the public schools; attended Oak Ridge Military Academy 1923–1925; graduated from Wake Forest College Law School in 1930; was admitted to the bar in 1930 and commenced the practice of law in Scotland Neck.

Wartime career with FBI
Beginning in 1933, he worked for the Federal Bureau of Investigation.  He served as special-agent-in-charge of the FBI's offices in several major cities, including Newark, NJ, New Orleans, LA, and Dallas, TX.  He retired from the FBI in August 1945, and then resumed the practice of law in Wadesboro, NC, his wife's hometown.

Service in U.S. House of Representatives
In 1956, Kitchin was elected as a Democrat to the Eighty-fifth Congress (January 3, 1957 - January 3, 1959), and was subsequently re-elected to the Eighty-sixth Congress (January 3, 1959 - January 3, 1961) as well as the Eighty-seventh Congress (January 3, 1961 – January 3, 1963).  In 1962, his Republican colleague Charles R. Jonas ran for re-election in the 8th district as a result of redistricting, and defeated Kitchin. Kitchin resumed the practice of law and was a resident of Wadesboro, North Carolina, until his death there on October 22, 1983.

References

Congressional Biographical Directory

1908 births
1983 deaths
Wake Forest University alumni
Democratic Party members of the United States House of Representatives from North Carolina
People from Wadesboro, North Carolina
Oak Ridge Military Academy alumni
North Carolina lawyers
Federal Bureau of Investigation personnel
20th-century American politicians